Kate Gordon Siegelbaum, known professionally as Kate Siegel (born 9 August 1982), is an American actress and screenwriter. She is best known for her collaborations with her husband, filmmaker Mike Flanagan, appearing in his films Oculus (2013), Hush (2016; she also wrote the screenplay with him), Ouija: Origin of Evil (2016), and Gerald's Game (2017), as well as in his television series The Haunting of Hill House (2018), The Haunting of Bly Manor (2020) and Midnight Mass (2021). She has been dubbed a "scream queen" due to her work in horror films and television.

Life
Siegel was born on 9 August 1982 in Silver Spring, Maryland. She attended St. Andrew's Episcopal School in Maryland, and graduated from Syracuse University in 2004. Siegel is Jewish. Siegel said in 2008 she was bisexual and had been in relationships with other women before. She married director Mike Flanagan in early 2016. They have two children: a son, Cody, and a daughter, Theodora, named after Siegel's character in The Haunting of Hill House. She is stepmother to Flanagan's eldest son from a previous relationship. She attended high school with stand-up comedian and actress Whitney Cummings.

Career
Siegel made her acting debut in the film The Curse of The Black Dahlia, which was released on January 23, 2007. That same year she went on to star in Hacia La Oscuridad which had its world premiere at the Tribeca Film Festival on April 28, 2007. She also appeared in Steam alongside Ruby Dee and Chelsea Handler. In 2008, Siegel appeared in the short film Knocked Down which was directed by Ted Collins. In 2009, she made her television debut in Ghost Whisperer as Cheryl. In 2010, she appeared in Numb3rs as Rachel Hollander. She then appeared in an episode of Castle. That same year she appeared in the drama-thriller Wedding Day.

In 2013, Siegel appeared in Man Camp. That same year she appeared in Oculus, a horror film written and directed by Flanagan. The film had its world premiere at the Toronto International Film Festival in September 2013, and was released in April 2014. She also appeared in an episode of Mob City. In 2014, she appeared in Demon Legacy.

In November 2015, it was revealed that she and Flanagan would be adapting the young adult novel 13 Days to Midnight into a film.

In 2016, Siegel starred as a deaf-mute woman beset by a killer in the horror-thriller Hush, a film on which she also made her screenwriting debut, co-writing with Flanagan. The film had its world premiere at South by Southwest on March 12, 2016, and was released on Netflix on April 8, 2016. In July 2016, she starred in a commercial for Stelara psoriasis medication. That same year, Siegel appeared in Ouija: Origin of Evil, also directed by Flanagan, which was released on October 21, 2016.

In 2017, Siegel starred alongside Carla Gugino and Bruce Greenwood in the film adaptation of Stephen King's Gerald's Game, which was also directed by Flanagan. The film was released on September 29, 2017, by Netflix.

In 2018, Siegel had a starring role as Theodora Crain in the Netflix supernatural horror series The Haunting of Hill House, based on Shirley Jackson's 1959 novel of the same name. She also narrated the podcast Calling Darkness and has been a voice actor for The NoSleep Podcast.

Siegel portrayed Erin Greene in Netflix's Midnight Mass which was written and directed by Flanagan, and co-starred her cast-mate from The Haunting of Hill House, Henry Thomas.

Filmography

Film

Television

Podcasts 
Her voice acting has appeared on the horror podcasts Calling Darkness and The NoSleep Podcast.

References

External links 
 

1982 births
Living people
21st-century American actresses
Actresses from Maryland
American bisexual actors
American film actresses
American television actresses
Bisexual actresses
American bisexual writers
Jewish American actresses
Jewish American writers
LGBT Jews
People from Silver Spring, Maryland
Screenwriters from Maryland
Syracuse University alumni